Gwynne McElveen (Born 8 March 1974) is an American-born Irish actress. Her most recent role is as Tobis in the new Syfy series Nightflyers, released in December 2018.

Early life
McElveen is the second youngest of 5 children.  She was born in Los Angeles, during a tremor. McElveen and her family moved to Ireland when she was a child.

Career 
She attended the Gaiety School of Acting in Dublin where she made her non-professional stage debut in the school's 1993 production of Colin Teevan's Tear up The Black Sail. Her professional stage debut was in 1994's True Lines, directed by John Crowley and devised alongside the director by McElveen, Stuart Townsend, Cathy Belton and Tom Murphy.

True Lines received critical acclaim, including from noted Irish theatre critic, Fintan O'Toole, and went on to win the Stewart Parker Award. True Lines was first performed in Kilkenny; it later moved to the Dublin Theatre Festival and on to the Bush Theatre in London.

McElveen became well known in the 1990s from her Irish stage work: 

 Ophelia in Second Age's Hamlet
 Lucy Manet at the Gate Theatre
 Eileen in Billy Roche's Poor Beast in The Rain, directed by Garry Hynes for Druid Theatre Company
 Angelica in Rimini Riddle at the Cork Opera House
 Titania in A Midsummer Night's Dream at Hampton Court Palace

While living in London, McElveen wrote and co-directed the award winning documentary Penumbra about a friend on death row in Arizona. The film was supported by the UK Film Council.

Returning to acting, McElveen retrained at Bow Street Academy. Shortly afterwards, Maureen Hughes, casting director, cast her as Catherine Finnegan in RTÉ's second series of Striking Out. McElveen was cast in Mary McGuckian's feature film "A Girl from Mogadishu" which was filmed in Dublin. It is based on the life of Ifrah Ahmed. McElveen will play 'Garda Niamh O'Donoughue' in "Doing Money" written by Gwyneth Hughes for BBC 2 Television. Based on a true story, the 90 minute film will be the flagship of "Why Slavery?", an international season of programmes scheduled for BBC in October 2018 to tie in with International Anti-Slavery Day. McElveen went on to play Tobis in the new Syfy series Nightflyers released in America in December 2018.

References

External links
Playography Ireland
Tod Tinkham Interview with Gywnne McElveen re: Penumbra Documentary
Penumbra

Irish television actresses
Irish stage actresses

1974 births
Living people